CENCO may refer to:

 Central Scientific Company
 Episcopal Conference of the Democratic Republic of the Congo, Conference Épiscopale Nationale du Congo